Víctor Castro may refer to:

 Víctor Castro (landowner) (1820–1900), landowner in California
 Víctor Castro (weightlifter) (born 1992), Spanish weightlifter
 Víctor Castro (weightlifter, born 1977), Peruvian weightlifter
 Víctor Castro (Mexican politician), Mexican politician from Baja California Sur
 Victor Hugo Castro (born 1975), boxer from Argentina
 Víctor Manuel Castro (1924–2011), Mexican actor, screenwriter and film director